Thymophylla tenuiloba, also known as the bristleleaf pricklyleaf, Dahlberg daisy, small bristleleaf pricklyleaf, golden fleece, or shooting star, is a bushy, multi-branched flowering annual from the family Asteraceae.  Native to south central Texas and northern Mexico, it produces a large number of small, yellow flowers and demonstrates a trailing habit.  It is tolerant of heat and dry conditions and is sometimes sold as a summertime annual plant in areas beyond its native range.

The plant was once known as Hymenatherum tenuilobum in the De Candolle system.

The species is naturalized in Queensland in Australia.

References

FLORIDATA page on Thymophylla tenuiloba
Flora of North America page
Atlas of Florida Vascular Plants page

External links

Tageteae
Plants described in 1903
Flora of Coahuila
Flora of Nuevo León
Flora of Texas
Flora naturalised in Australia